Paul Kidby (born 1964) is an English artist. Many people know him best for his art based on Terry Pratchett's Discworld. He has been included on the sleeve covers since Pratchett's original illustrator, Josh Kirby, died in 2001.

Early life
Kidby was born in West London in 1964. He worked a dental technician making replacement teeth, before later becoming a commercial artist and then a freelance illustrator in 1986.

Career
Between 1991 and 1995, Future Publishing employed Kidby and he helped design and paint more than 20 magazine covers.

In 1993 he began work on the collaboration for which he is best known; Terry Pratchett's Discworld series. Terry's Discworld art, and many other Terry type descriptions of pieces, are included in The Pratchett Portfolio (1996) and The Art of Discworld (2004).  These full versions of work and some paintings previously seen in the light of theatre. He also worked and designed an illustrated The Last Hero, a Discworld "fable" and number-five bestseller in the United Kingdom, his "90 beautiful illustrations" described as "augment[ing] the impact of this vividly described magical world."

Kidby's art frequently parodies well known paintings such as the Mona Lisa by Leonardo da Vinci, Night Watch by Rembrandt (featured on the cover of Night Watch) and An Experiment on a Bird in the Air Pump by Joseph Wright.

In December 2007 Terry Pratchett used Kidby's website to announce he was suffering from early-onset Alzheimer's disease.

Kidby was painting the cover for The Shepherd's Crown, the last Discworld novel, when he heard that Pratchett had died.

In August 2016 Kidby released "Terry Pratchett’s Discworld Colouring Book" of black and white line drawings.

Personal life
Kidby currently lives and works in Dorset.

References

External links

 
 
 

1964 births
English artists
British speculative fiction artists
Fantasy artists
People associated with the Discworld series
People from the London Borough of Ealing
People from Fordingbridge
Living people
Date of birth missing (living people)